Justin Sean Grace (born 9 September 1970) is a New Zealand former racing cyclist and cycling coach. He represented New Zealand at the 2002 and 2006 Commonwealth Games. In 2014, Grace was appointed the national sprint coach for the Great Britain cycling team.

References

External links

1970 births
Living people
New Zealand male cyclists
Cyclists at the 2002 Commonwealth Games
Cyclists at the 2006 Commonwealth Games
Sportspeople from Calgary
21st-century New Zealand people